Southern Railway No. 1102 was a 4-6-0 Baldwin Class F-14 steam locomotive built in 1903 by Baldwin Locomotive Works for Southern Railway. It was used on the Fast Mail trains between Washington, D.C., and Atlanta, Georgia. The locomotive gained notoriety for being involved in the derailment of September 27, 1903, that served as the inspiration for the ballad Wreck of the Old 97. Upon being rebuilt, the locomotive continued its career on the Southern for more than thirty years, until it was scrapped on July 9, 1935, at the Southern Railway's Princeton Shops in Princeton, Indiana.

References

Further reading
 

Individual locomotives of the United States
Scrapped locomotives
Steam locomotives of Southern Railway (U.S.)
4-6-0 locomotives
Standard gauge locomotives of the United States
Railway locomotives introduced in 1903